The Revolt Tour was a tour by rap rock band Hollywood Undead, taking place in support of their second studio album American Tragedy, which was released on April 5, 2011. The tour began the day after the album's North American release on April 6, 2011. The tour follows their supporting role in Bullet for my Valentine's Fever Tour in late 2010 and Avenged Sevenfold's Nightmare After Christmas Tour in early 2011. It is the band's first headlining promotional tour following their 2009 touring in support of their 2008 debut album, Swan Songs.

The tour began in Boston, Massachusetts on April 6, 2011 and concluded on May 27 in Des Moines, Iowa. The tour venues consisted mainly of "House of Blues" locations along with other various venues along the way. Following the Revolt Tour, Hollywood Undead played several festivals then headlined a second major tour, the Endless Summer Tour, where they were joined by All That Remains beginning on July 9, 2011. Supporting act All That Remains was in the tour in support of their album, For We Are Many.

Set list
{{hidden
| headercss = background: #ccccff; font-size: 100%; width: 65%;
| contentcss = text-align: left; font-size: 100%; width: 75%;
| header = Hollywood Undead (headliner)
| content = 
 "Undead"
 "Sell Your Soul"
 "Been to Hell"
 "Bottle and a Gun"
 "Gangsta Sexy" (performed in place of "Bottle and a Gun" on certain tour dates)
 "California"
 "City"
 "Black Dahlia"
 "Comin' in Hot"
 "Paradise Lost"
 "My Town"
 "No. 5"
 "Young"

Encore
 "Everywhere I Go"
 "Hear Me Now"
}}

Tour dates

Support acts
10 Years
Drive-A
New Medicine

External links
Official tour website

References 

2011 concert tours